Koanophyllon sinaloense is a species of flowering plant in the family Asteraceae. It is found only in the States of Sonora and Sinaloa in northwestern Mexico.

Koanophyllon sinaloense is a shrub up to 2 meters (80 inches or almost 7 feet) tall. One plant will produce many small flower heads in a flat-topped array, each head with 13-19 white or pale lavender disc flowers but no ray flowers.

References

sinaloense
Flora of Sinaloa
Flora of Sonora
Plants described in 1987